Huberodendron patinoi is a species of flowering plant in the Malvaceae family. It is found in Colombia, Ecuador, and possibly Panama. It is threatened by habitat loss.

References

Bombacoideae
Flora of Colombia
Flora of Ecuador
Vulnerable plants
Taxonomy articles created by Polbot